Saint Joe is an unincorporated community in Preston County, West Virginia, United States.

The community was named for the fact three of its first settlers were named Joseph.

References 

Unincorporated communities in West Virginia
Unincorporated communities in Preston County, West Virginia